The 1947–48 Czechoslovak Extraliga season was the fifth season of the Czechoslovak Extraliga, the top level of ice hockey in Czechoslovakia. 12 teams participated in the league, and LTC Prag won the championship.

Regular season

Group A

Group B

Final 

 LTC Prag – I. ČLTK Prag 7:1
 I. ČLTK Praha – LTC Prag 5:13

External links
History of Czechoslovak ice hockey

Czechoslovak Extraliga seasons
Czech
1947 in Czechoslovak sport
1948 in Czechoslovak sport